Lieutenant General Rhett Anthony Hernandez (born March 9, 1953) is a retired officer in the United States Army and the former commander of the United States Army Cyber Command, the Army's service component to United States Cyber Command. Hernandez assumed the position upon its activation on October 10, 2010, with its headquarters at Fort Belvoir, Virginia.

Military career
Hernandez was commissioned into the United States Army in 1976 as a Field Artillery officer upon graduation from the United States Military Academy. During his career, he held posts with numerous field artillery units as well as a number of staff officer positions. Hernandez was the Assistant G-3/5/7, Headquarters, Department of the Army; the Chief, United States Military Training Mission in Saudi Arabia; and the Commander, United States Army Human Resources Command. Hernandez also attended the University of Virginia, where he received a master's degree in Systems Engineering and he attended the National War College where he received a master's degree in National Security and Strategic Studies.

Hernandez commanded the United States Army Cyber Command from its creation on October 1, 2010, until he handed command over to Lieutenant General Edward C. Cardon on September 3, 2013. He received a promotion to lieutenant general on March 25, 2011. As head of Army Cyber Command, Hernandez was responsible for planning, coordinating, and integrating the network operations and defense of all United States Army networks. Hernandez was also tasked with conducting cyberspace operations in support of army operations through his command of approximately 21,000 soldiers and civilians. Hernandez oversaw a command that brought an unprecedented unity of effort and synchronization of all Army forces operating within the cyber domain. Under Hernandez, the command concentrated its efforts on operationalizing cyberspace and improving Army capabilities in the cyberspace domain. As a first step, the command established the Army Cyber Operations and Integration Center collocating intelligence, operations, and signal staffs, together with a critical targeting function, and bringing a new synergy to Army cyberspace operations. To improve the Army's cyber capabilities the command fielded a World Class Cyber Opposing Force at the National Training Center; developed new doctrinal concepts for Land-Cyber operations; and identified the Army's capability requirements needed to fully operationalize the cyberspace domain and grow the Army's cyber force. He currently serves on the Board of Advisors of the Military Cyber Professionals Association (MCPA).

Hernandez retired on September 4, 2013.

Awards
Hernandez received the Army Distinguished Service Medal (2), Defense Superior Service Medal (2), the Legion of Merit (2), the Bronze Star Medal, the Meritorious Service Medal (5), the Army Commendation Medal (5), the Army Achievement Medal (2), the Combat Action Badge, the Joint Chiefs of Staff Identification Badge, and the Army Staff Identification Badge.

References

United States Army generals
Recipients of the Defense Superior Service Medal
Recipients of the Legion of Merit
Living people
1953 births